Guido is a given name Latinised from the Old High German name Wido. It originated in Medieval Italy. Guido later became a male first name in Austria, Germany, the Low Countries, Scandinavia, Spain, Portugal, Latin America and Switzerland. The meaning of the name is debated, with various sources indicating the Germanic "Wido" means "wood" and others connecting the Italian form "Guido" to the latinate root for "guide".

The slang term Guido is used in American culture to refer derogatorily to an urban working-class Italian or Italian-American male who is overly aggressive or macho with a tendency for certain conspicuous behavior. It may also be used as a more general ethnic slur for working-class urban Italian Americans.

People

Given name
Medieval times
Guido of Acqui (–1070), bishop of Acqui, Italy
Guido of Anderlecht (–1012), Belgian saint
Guido of Arezzo (–after 1033), Italian music theorist
Guido da Velate, (died 1071) bishop of Milan
Guido Bonatti (died ), Italian mathematician, astronomer and astrologer
Guido Cavalcanti (–1300), Italian (Florentine) poet and friend of Dante
Guido delle Colonne, Italian writer and contemporary of Dante
Guido I da Montefeltro (1223–1298), advisor to Pope Boniface VIII
Guido di Pietro (–1455), Italian Renaissance painter better known as Fra Angelico
Guido of Pisa (d. 1169), Italian geographer
Guido of Siena, 13th-century Italian painter
Guido II of Spoleto (died 882), Duke of Spoleto and Margrave of Camerino
Guy III of Spoleto (died 895), King of Italy and Holy Roman Emperor
Later use
Guido Alvarenga (born 1970), Paraguayan footballer
Guido Buchwald (b. 1961) German footballer
Guido Cagnacci (1601–1663), Italian painter  
Guido Calabresi (b. 1932), American judge and former Dean of Yale Law School
Guido Calza (1888–1946) Italian archaeologist
Guido Cantelli (1920–1956), Italian orchestral conductor
Guido Cantz (born 1971), German television presenter 
Guido Castelnuovo (1865–1952), Italian mathematician
Guido de Bres (1522–1567), Belgian pastor, theologian, author of Belgic Confession
Guido De Padt (born 1954), Belgian politician, Minister of the Interior
Guido Deiro (1886–1950), Italian-born vaudeville piano-accordionist
Guido Fanconi (1892–1979), Swiss pediatrician
Guy Fawkes (later Guido Fawkes) (1570–1606), English Catholic who attempted to blow up the Houses of Parliament in the Gunpowder Plot
Guido Fubini (1879–1943), Italian mathematician
Guido Gezelle (1830–1899), Flemish writer, poet and priest
Guido Görtzen (born 1970), Dutch volleyball player
Guido Grandi (1671–1742), Italian priest and professor of mathematics 
Guido Guerrini, (b. 1976), Italian rally driver
Guido Imbens (b. 1963), Dutch-American economist
Guido Knopp (b. 1946), German historian, journalist and producer of history documentaries
Guido Kratschmer (b. 1953), German decathlete and former world record holder
Guido de Lavezaris, Spanish Governor General of the Philippines
Guido von List (1848–1919), Austrian occultist, journalist, playwright, and novelist
Guido Mantega (b. 1949), Italian-born Finance Minister of Brazil
Guido de Marco (1931–2010), Maltese politician, who served as the sixth President of Malta from 1999 to 2004
Guido Marini (b. 1965), Italian  Roman Catholic priest, current Master of Pontifical Liturgical Celebrations
Guido Migliozzi (b. 1997), Italian golfer
Guido Morselli (b. 1912), Italian writer 
Guido Pella (b. 1990), Argentine tennis player
Guido Quaroni (b. 1970), Italian computer modeller and animator at Pixar Studios
Guido Reni (1575–1642), Italian painter
Guido Reybrouck (born 1941), Belgian cyclist
Guido Stampacchia (1922–1978), Italian mathematician
Guido van Rossum (b. 1956), Dutch programmer, creator of the Python programming language
Guido Vildoso (b. 1937), General Guido Hernán Vildoso Calderón (born 5 April 1937, La Paz, Bolivia) is a former officer in the Military of Bolivia and de facto President of Bolivia in 1982
Guido Westerwelle (1961–2016), Foreign Minister and Vice-Chancellor of Germany
Guido Wieland (1906-1993), Austrian actor

Family name
 José María Guido (1910–1975), president of Argentina between 1962 and 1963.
 Peggy Guido (1912–1994), also known as Peggy Piggott, English archaeologist and prehistorian.
 Tomás Guido (1788-1866), Argentine general, diplomat and politician.

Fictional characters
Guido Mista, the gunman of Bucciarati's gang in part 5 of the manga, JoJo's Bizarre Adventure
 Guido Anselmi, film director played by Marcello Mastroianni in Federico Fellini's film 8 1/2 
Commissario Guido Brunetti, the protagonist of Donna Leon's crime fiction series set in Venice, Italy
 Father Guido Sarducci, fictional character portrayed by American comedian Don Novello
 Guido Hatzis, comic character created by Australian comedians Moclair and Schiller
 Guido Carosella a.k.a. Strong Guy, a fictional mutant from the Marvel Comics universe
 Guido, a character in the Cars franchise
 Guido, a Microraptor gui character who appears in The Land Before Time XII: The Great Day of the Flyers and the TV episode "The Hermit of Black Rock"
 Guido, a character in the Myth Adventures series created by Robert Asprin
 Prince Guido (Russian: Gvidon), character from The Tale of Tsar Saltan by Alexander Pushkin
 Guido il Cortese, the protagonist in Mary Shelley's short story "Transformation"
 Guido, the killer pimp in Risky Business portrayed by Joe Pantoliano
 Guido Anchovy, a main character from the animated cartoon series Samurai Pizza Cats
 Guido Orefice, main protagonist in the Italian comedy film Life Is Beautiful

Other
Guido Fawkes, a British political website run by blogger Paul Staines

See also
 Guideschi
 List of Latinised names

References 

Italian masculine given names
German masculine given names
Spanish masculine given names
Portuguese masculine given names
Dutch masculine given names